Justice Bell or Judge Bell, may refer to:

People
Judges named Bell include:

 Bennett Douglas Bell (1852–1934), associate justice of the Tennessee Supreme Court
 Charles S. Bell (1880–1965), associate justice of the Supreme Court of Ohio
 James F. Bell (judge) (1915–2005), associate justice of the Supreme Court of Ohio
 James H. Bell (1825–1892), associate justice of the Texas Supreme Court
 John C. Bell Jr. (1892–1974), associate justice and chief justice of the Pennsylvania Supreme Court
 Kenneth B. Bell, associate justice of the Florida Supreme Court
 Richard Bell (Georgia judge) (1920–2005), associate justice of the Supreme Court of Georgia
 R. C. Bell (judge) (1880–1962), associate justice of the Supreme Court of Georgia
 Robert M. Bell (born 1943), judge of the Maryland Court of Appeals
 Samuel Dana Bell (1798–1868), chief justice of the New Hampshire Supreme Court
 Virginia Bell (judge) (born 1951), justice of the High Court of Australia

Other uses
 Justice Bell (Valley Forge), Pennsylvania, USA; a replica of the Liberty Bell used to campaign for women's suffrage

See also

 Bell (surname)
 Judge Bell (disambiguation)
 Bell (disambiguation)